"Days of Summer" is Ana Johnsson's first single from her new album called Little Angel. According to Her Swedish official website, the single was released on July 12, 2006, with July 5 being the formal release date. The single debuted at number 7 in the Swedish singles chart.

Formats and track listing
CD single
"Days of Summer" – 3:10
"Falling to Pieces" – 3:25

Charts

References

External links

Ana Johnsson songs
2006 singles
2006 songs
Songs written by Kalle Engström